Chahar Tang-e Sofla (also Romanized as Chahār Tang-e Soflá and Chahār Tang Soflá; also known as Chahār Tang-e Pā’īn) is a village in Howmeh-ye Sharqi Rural District, in the Central District of Izeh County, Khuzestan Province, Iran. At the 2006 census, its population was 345, in 51 families.

References 

Populated places in Izeh County